Hirtocoelius is a monotypic Australasian genus of potter wasps. The sole species is Hirtocoelius aureoniger.

References

Potter wasps
Monotypic Hymenoptera genera